Anthony "Tumac" Accetturo (born 1938) is a former caporegime and leader of the New Jersey faction of the Lucchese crime family, popularly called "The Jersey Crew."

Biography
Accetturo was born in 1938 in Orange, New Jersey.  His father was a butcher, his mother a seamstress. Accetturo dropped out of school after completing the sixth grade. At age 16, Accetturo moved to Newark and became the leader of a large street gang. He gained a reputation as a ferocious street fighter, which led several of his fellow gang members to call him "Tumac," after the caveman hero of the 1940 adventure film One Million B.C.

At age 17, Accetturo was recruited by Anthony "Ham" Delasco, the boss of the Jersey Crew.  By the early 1960s, he had become Delasco's driver. Accetturo became Delasco's protégé learning trades in illegal gambling and loansharking controlling the Newark area. Delasco died in the late 1960s and Accetturo became a major earner under his successor, Joseph Abate, as well as a major player in his own right in the New Jersey underworld.  He soon grew rich in the family, netting about $500,000 yearly.

New Jersey crew
In 1970, Accetturo moved to Florida to avoid an investigation of his gambling operations in Newark. Another reason for his move was that South Florida was open to all the crime families for exploitation.  In the early 1970s, Abate went into semi-retirement, and Lucchese boss Anthony "Tony Ducks" Corallo put Accetturo in charge of the entire Lucchese operation in New Jersey. The membership books of the Mafia had been closed since 1957, so Accetturo wasn't an official member yet. This made his promotion even more remarkable, since Corallo chose him over several made men who had previously been his superiors. Nonetheless, in the eyes of Corallo, Abate and the family leadership, Accetturo represented the Mafia ideal: loyal, trustworthy and a good earner. During his absence, Accetturo designated his lieutenant, Michael "Mad Dog" Taccetta of Florham Park, to run the day-to-day operations of the crew.

In 1976, with Abate as his sponsor, Accetturo finally became a made man in the Lucchese crime family along with the Taccetta brothers, Michael and Martin. Accetturo described getting inducted into the family as "the greatest honor of my life" at the time. He recalled that his ceremony was somewhat less elaborate than was normally the case for someone who was due to become "a friend of ours."  Although the ceremony—spilling a drop of blood on a picture of a saint and burning it—was ostensibly secret, its broad lines were very well known in the Italian-American community. Accetturo was thus surprised when Corallo simply told him to burn a picture of a saint and swear not to betray the Lucchese family. He later found out that the top leadership of the family thought so highly of him that they felt they could dispense with the usual formalities.  Accetturo would finally become the official boss of the Jersey Crew by 1979 when Abate retired.

In February 1973, Accetturo was indicted for loansharking and extortion. He was eventually arrested in Miami with his bail set at $10,000. In 1976, the State of New Jersey tried to extradite Accetturo from Florida, however he fended off the order due to poor health. Based in Hollywood, Florida, Accetturo would continue to elude federal authorities while remaining involved in Lucchese interests in New Jersey. In 1980, the murder of Philadelphia crime family boss Angelo "The Gentle Don" Bruno, created a power vacuum in that family, with rivals Philip Testa and Nicodemo Scarfo fighting for control. 

On October 18, 1985 Accetturo was indicted on charges of threatening government witnesses and posing a threat to public safety. He was later charged with intimidating of competitors of the Lucchese-controlled Taccetta Group Enterprises, along with credit card and wire fraud. Facing a number of federal prosecutions, Accetturo was granted a stay of sentence and was allowed to live in his Florida residence.

In 1987, Accetturo, Taccetta and several other Jersey Crew members went on trial for narcotics and racketeering charges. One of the longest trials in U.S. history, the trial went on for 21 months. When the verdict was read, the defendants were pronounced not guilty on all counts, a stunning rebuke to the government. As it turned out, however, the trial had been compromised by jury tampering—a common problem for Mafia trials. When the Luccheses got word that the nephew of an unidentified Jersey Crew capo was on the jury, they paid him $100,000 to vote for acquittal.  Acceturo thus went into the courtroom knowing he was assured of at least a hung jury.   During the RICO trial, the relationship between Accetturo and Taccetta deteriorated into an outright power struggle. Taccetta was jealous of the rise of Accetturo's son, Anthony Accetturo Jr., within the New Jersey crew. Taccetta also felt that the father had given him very little respect and deference over the years that he had been watching the New Jersey operation.

Finally, Taccetta ordered a murder contract on the senior Accetturo. When the trial ended in acquittals for the defendants, Accetturo returned to Florida for his own safety. In September 1989, New Jersey authorities extradited Accetturo from North Carolina due to his refusal to appear and testify before a grand jury about labor racketeering and other state offenses. Due to Taccetta's murder contract, Accetturo was placed in protective custody. In 1993, Taccetta was sent to federal prison.

Amuso and Casso
During the last years of the Corallo regime, Accetturo had been decreasing his tribute to the point that he was only giving the family $50,000 a year. Although Corallo and Accetturo had an "unbelievably great" relationship, Corallo was undemanding when it came to money. As the years went by, Corallo had lowered his demands from the Jersey Crew.

In late 1986, the entire Lucchese hierarchy—Corallo, underboss Salvatore "Tom Mix" Santoro and consigliere Christopher "Christie Tick" Furnari was handed 100-year sentences in the 1986 Commission case. Before the end of the trial, Corallo realized that he would not only be convicted, but that any sentence would be long enough to assure he would die in prison.  He engineered a peaceful transition of power that saw Vittorio "Vic" Amuso become the new boss. Shortly afterward, one of Amuso's compatriots, Anthony "Gaspipe" Casso, became underboss.

The ascension of Amuso and Casso ended Accetturo's idyllic lifestyle.  They demanded that Accetturo turn over 50% of the crew's proceeds to them. When Accetturo refused, the two bosses "pulled down" (demoted) Accetturo from capo to soldier.  They also put contracts on both Accetturo and his son, also a member of the Jersey Crew. In the fall of 1988, the entire Jersey Crew was summoned to meet with Amuso in Brooklyn—ostensibly to be told of the new chain of command. However, fearing that this was a setup for a massacre, everyone refused to go, and went into hiding soon afterward.  With the family's interests in New Jersey in a shambles, an enraged Amuso issued the now-infamous "Whack Jersey" order, demanding that everyone in the faction be murdered.

Over the next 12 months, most of the Jersey Crew's members came back to the family. Amuso told the returned crew members that Accetturo was an outlaw and needed to be eliminated. Amuso sent hitmen to Florida, searching for Accetturo and his son, Anthony, Jr. However, Amuso didn't know that Accetturo was in jail in New Jersey, for refusing to testify in front a state panel.

In 1993, Accetturo was convicted on racketeering charges. He faced a sentence of at least 30 years in prison—tantamount to a life sentence at his age.  He also learned that Amuso and Casso had marked his wife for death.  Although Accetturo had known that Amuso and Casso had put contracts on both him and his son, the discovery that they were targeting his wife as well was the last straw. Not only did it violate a long-standing Mafia rule against harming women, but Mrs. Acceturo had served many of them meals in headier days. Blaming Amuso and Casso for the turmoil in the family, Accetturo decided to turn informer in hopes of saving his life and gaining a lenient sentence.  The investigation that ultimately brought him down was led by Robert Buccino, a childhood friend who was now a top organized-crime expert in the New Jersey Attorney General's office

Accetturo's decision to break his blood oath was a major coup for investigators. As the highest-ranking New Jersey mobster at the time to turn informer and a three-decade veteran of the Mafia, Accetturo provided investigators with a clear picture of the Lucchese family, including its penetration and exploitation of businesses in New Jersey and its relationship with corrupt officials. Accetturo provided information on 13 murders, although he insisted he never personally participated in the slayings. Accetturo provided unexpected information about the origins of the New Jersey family, going back to 1931 and Lucky Luciano. Mysteries about the relationship between the American and Sicilian Mafia were also clarified. As a result of his cooperation, Accetturo was sentenced to a maximum of 20 years in prison in December 1994. However, in December 2002, his sentence was reduced to time served, and he retired to the South.
 
In an interview with The New York Times writer and Mafia historian Selwyn Raab, Accetturo said he would have never even considered turning informer had Corallo still been running the family. In those days, he said, the Mafia was run by men who never put money above honor and only killed as a last resort. As he saw it, Amuso and Casso were the ones who betrayed Cosa Nostra principles. Accetturo was especially bitter about Casso, saying that "all he wanted to do is kill, kill, get what you can, even if you didn't earn it."

Upon learning that he and his wife were targeted to be killed, reputed mob enforcer, Thomas Ricciardi, went on to testify against the Taccetta brothers and the remaining defendants. Martin and Michael Taccetta were sentenced to 25-years to life imprisonment for racketeering, narcotics, extortion, loansharking, conspiracy and murder in 1993. Taccetta reportedly went on to control the Jersey Crew, as he was doing his sentence in Atlanta.

Popular culture
The 2006 Sidney Lumet film Find Me Guilty chronicles the two-year trial of Accetturo and other family members. In the film, Accetturo is given the name Nick Calabrese. He was played by Alex Rocco.

References

Further reading
Raab, Selwyn. The Five Families: The Rise, Decline & Resurgence of America's Most Powerful Mafia Empire. New York: St. Martins Press, 2005. 
Rudolph, Robert C. The Boys from New Jersey: How the Mob Beat the Feds. New York: William Morrow and Company Inc., 1992. 
Pistone, Joseph D.; & Brandt, Charles (2007). Donnie Brasco: Unfinished Business, Running Press. .

External links
New York Times: Second Lawyer Balks At Taking Defense
New York Sun: Ex-Mobster Claims an FBI Cover-Up by Jerry Capeci
Ocean County Observer: Crime boss nears parole date by Don Bennett
Crime Boss: Did FBI Frame A Former Crime Boss For Murder ? by Clarence Walker
Yahoo Movies;(2006) Find Me Guilty
New York Times: Mafia Defector Says He Lost His Faith by Selwyn Raab

 

1938 births
Living people
American Mafia cooperating witnesses
American gangsters of Sicilian descent
Lucchese crime family
Lucchese crime family New Jersey faction
People from Orange, New Jersey
Gangsters from Newark, New Jersey